The use of the English language in current and former member countries of the Commonwealth of Nations was largely inherited from British colonisation, with some exceptions. English serves as the medium of inter-Commonwealth relations.

Many regions, notably Australia, Brunei, Canada, Hong Kong, India, Ireland, Malaysia, New Zealand, Pakistan, Singapore, South Africa, Sri Lanka and the Caribbean, have developed their own native varieties of the language. Mozambique, which joined the Commonwealth in 1996, is a special case: English is widely spoken there, despite it being a former Portuguese colony (though the port of Chinde was leased by Britain from 1891 to 1923). English is spoken as a first or second language in most of the Commonwealth.

Written English in the current and former Commonwealth generally favours British spelling as opposed to American, with some exceptions, particularly in Canada, where there are strong influences from neighbouring American English. Few Commonwealth countries besides Canada and Australia have produced their own variant English dictionaries and style guides, and may rely on those produced in other countries.

Native varieties 
Southern Hemisphere native varieties of English began to develop during the 18th century, with the colonisation of Australasia and South Africa. Australian English and New Zealand English are closely related to each other, and share some similarities with South African English (though it has unique influences from indigenous African languages, and Dutch influences it inherited along with the development of Afrikaans from Dutch).

Canadian English contains elements of British English and American English, as well as many Canadianisms and some French influences. It is the product of several waves of immigration and settlement, from Britain, Ireland, France, the United States, and around the world, over a period of almost two centuries. Modern Canadian English has taken significant vocabulary and spelling from the shared political and social institutions of Commonwealth countries.

Caribbean 
Caribbean English is influenced by the English-based Creole varieties spoken, but they are not one and the same. There is a great deal of variation in the way English is spoken, with a "Standard English" at one end of a bipolar linguistic continuum and Creole languages at the other. These dialects have roots in 17th-century British and Irish English, and African languages, plus localised influences from other colonial languages including French, Spanish, and Dutch; unlike most native varieties of English, West Indian dialects often tend to be syllable-timed rather than stress-timed.

Non-native varieties 

Second-language varieties of English in Africa and Asia have often undergone "indigenisation"; that is, each English-speaking community has developed (or is in the process of developing) its own standards of usage, often under the influence of local languages. These dialects are sometimes referred to as New Englishes (McArthur, p. 36); most of them inherited non-rhoticity from Southern British English.

Africa 
Several dialects of West African English exist, with a lot of regional variation and some influence from indigenous languages. West African English tends to be syllable-timed, and its phoneme inventory is much simpler than that of Received Pronunciation; this sometimes affects mutual intelligibility with native varieties of English. A distinctive North African English, often with significant influences from Bantu languages such as Swahili, is spoken in countries such as Kenya or Tanzania, particularly in Nairobi and other cities where there is an expanding middle class, for whom English is increasingly being used in the home as the first language.

Small communities of native English speakers can be found in Zimbabwe, Botswana, and Namibia; the dialects spoken are similar to native South African English.

Asia

Indian subcontinent 

English was introduced into the subcontinent by the British Raj. Among the partitioned post-independent countries, India has the largest English-speaking population in the Commonwealth, although comparatively very few speakers of Indian English are first-language speakers. The same is true of English spoken in other parts of South Asia, e.g. Pakistani English, Sri Lankan English, Bangladeshi English and Myanmar English. South Asian English phonology is highly variable; stress, rhythm and intonation are generally different from those of native varieties. There are also several peculiarities at the levels of morphology, syntax and usage, some of which can also be found among educated speakers.

Malay Archipelago 

Southeast Asian English comprises Singapore English, Malaysian English, and Brunei English; it features some influence from Malay and Chinese languages, as well as Indian English.

Hong Kong ceased to be part of the Commonwealth in 1997. Nonetheless, the English language there still enjoys status as an official language.

See also
 British English
 American English
 EF English Proficiency Index
 English-speaking world

Other languages:
 Community of Portuguese Language Countries
Dutch Language Union
 La Francophonie
 Latin Union
 List of countries by spoken languages

References 
 McArthur, Tom (2002). The Oxford Guide to World English. Oxford: Oxford University Press. .
 Peters, Pam (2004). The Cambridge Guide to English Usage. Cambridge: Cambridge University Press. .
 Trudgill, Peter & Hannah, Jean (2002). International English: A Guide to the Varieties of Standard English; 4th ed. London: Arnold. .

Specific

Commonwealth of Nations
Symbols of the Commonwealth of Nations